Chrysothyridia invertalis is a moth in the family Crambidae. It was described by Snellen in 1877. It is found on Sulawesi, as well as in New Guinea and Australia, where it has been recorded from Queensland.

References

Moths described in 1877
Spilomelinae